Venavanshi [1] The details of the origin of this name are prevalent. One explanation is that the origin of this sub-caste comes from King Ven, who was a staunch opponent of the religion established by the sages. The kings of Mirzapur Singrauli are their chieftains and they call themselves Benvanshi Rajputs. It is said that till a generation or two ago, when Dudhi Kharwars died here, the people of this family also used to shave their heads. Hindus live here. He himself wears Janeu and he has succeeded in making marriage relations among famous descendants like Chandelo.

References
 Benvanshi Rajput
 Kharwar Rajput

Indian names